Vujačić is a Serbian and Montenegrin surname. Notable people with the surname include:

 Budimir Vujačić (born 1964), Montenegrin footballer
 Igor Vujačić (born 1994), Montenegrin footballer
 Mihajlo Vujačić (born 1973), a Montenegrin footballer
 Aleksander "Sasha" Vujačić (born 1984), Slovenian basketball player of Serbian and Montenegrin descent

See also 
 Vujičić
 Vujčić

Serbian surnames
Montenegrin surnames